Hylonomus (hylo- "forest" + nomos "dweller") is an extinct genus of reptile that lived 312 million years ago during the Late Carboniferous period.
It is the earliest unquestionable reptile (Westlothiana is older, but in fact it may have been an amphibian, and Casineria is rather fragmentary). The only species is the type species Hylonomus lyelli. Despite being amongst the oldest known reptiles, it is not the most primitive member of group, being a eureptile more derived than either parareptiles or captorhinids.

Description

 
Most of them are 20 cm long and probably would have looked rather similar to modern lizards. It had small sharp teeth and it likely ate small invertebrates such as millipedes or early insects.

Fossils of Hylonomus have been found in the remains of fossilized club moss stumps in the Joggins Formation, Joggins, Nova Scotia, Canada. It is supposed that, after harsh weather, the club mosses would crash down, with the stumps eventually rotting and hollowing out. Small animals such as Hylonomus, seeking shelter, would enter and become trapped, starving to death. An alternative hypothesis is that the animals made their nests in the hollow tree stumps.

Fossils of the basal pelycosaur Archaeothyris and the basal diapsid Petrolacosaurus are also found in the same region of Nova Scotia, although from a higher stratum, dated approximately 6 million years later.

Fossilized footprints found in New Brunswick have been attributed to Hylonomus, at an estimated age of 315 million years.

This animal was discovered by John William Dawson in the mid-19th century. The species' name was given it by Dawson's teacher, the geologist Sir Charles Lyell. While it has traditionally been included in the group Protorothyrididae, it has since been recovered outside this group.

Hylonomus lyelli was named the Provincial Fossil of Nova Scotia in 2002.

References

External links 
Fossils of Nova Scotia - The Tree Stump Animals 
Transitional Vertebrate Fossils FAQ Part 1B 
Early Researchers & Finds of the Joggins Fossil Cliffs
The Science of the Joggins Fossil Cliffs
Hylonomus: Provincial Fossil of Nova Scotia
A photograph of the disarticulated skeleton, credited to J. Calder
Another photo of the specimen, from Dr. Melissa Grey's twitter account

Prehistoric romeriids
Carboniferous reptiles of North America
Transitional fossils
Prehistoric reptile genera
Paleozoic life of Nova Scotia
Pennsylvanian genus first appearances
Pennsylvanian genus extinctions